Najsłabsze ogniwo was the Polish version of the game show Weakest Link aired from 1 March 2004 to 22 December 2005 on TVN. The show was hosted by Kazimiera Szczuka. The show pitted eight contestants against each other for a pot of 27,000 złotys (PLN). This show was watched usually by 3 million viewers (average 1,5 million).

The game's prizes for questions
 1. question correct • 100 zł
 2. question correct • 300 zł
 3. question correct • 600 zł
 4. question correct • 900 zł
 5. question correct • 1,300 zł
 6. question correct • 1,800 zł
 7. question correct • 2,400 zł
 8. question correct • 3,000 zł

References

Polish game shows
2004 Polish television series debuts
2006 Polish television series endings
TVN (Polish TV channel) original programming
The Weakest Link